Line 6 may refer to:

Metro lines

Asia

China
Line 6 (Beijing Subway), a subway line in Beijing
Line 6 (Changsha Metro), a metro line in Changsha, Hunan
Line 6 (Chengdu Metro), from Pidu District to Tianfu New Area, Chengdu, Sichuan
Line 6 (Chongqing Rail Transit), a metro line in Chongqing
Line 6 (Fuzhou Metro), from Cangshan District to Changle District, Fuzhou, Fujian
Line 6 (Guangzhou Metro), a metro line in Guangzhou, Guangdong
Line 6 (Hangzhou Metro), a metro line in Hangzhou, Zhejiang
Line 6 (Kunming Metro), a metro line in Kunming, Yunnan
Line 6 (Shanghai Metro), a metro line in Shanghai
Line 6 (Shenzhen Metro), a metro line in Shenzhen, Guangdong
Line 6 (Tianjin Metro), a metro line in Tianjin
Line 6 (Wuhan Metro), a metro line in Wuhan, Hubei
Line 6 (Xi'an Metro), a metro line in Xi'an, Shaanxi
Line 6 (Zhengzhou Metro), a metro line in Zhengzhou, Henan

Other places in Asia
Line 6 (Mumbai Metro), also called the Lokhandwala-Jogeshwari-Vikhroli-Kanjurmarg corridor, Mumbai, India
Line 6 (Osaka), an underground rapid transit line in Osaka, Japan
Seoul Subway Line 6, a line of the Seoul Subway, Korea
Line 6 (Taipei Metro), a line of the Taipei Metro, Taiwan
 KLIA Ekspres, called Line 6 at route map
 Manila Light Rail Transit System Line 6, Metro Manila, Philippines
 MRT Line 6 (Dhaka Metro), Metro Rail Line 6 in Dhaka, Bangladesh

Europe

France
Île-de-France tramway Line 6, a rubber-tyred tramway in Île-de-France
Paris Métro Line 6,a line of the Paris Métro rapid transit system

Austria
U6 (Berlin U-Bahn), a metro line in Berlin U-Bahn
U6 (Frankfurt U-Bahn), a metro line in Frankfurt U-Bahn

Spain
Barcelona Metro line 6, on the Barcelona–Vallès Line
Line 6 (Madrid Metro), one of two circular lines in Madrid

Other places in Europe
Line 6 (Moscow Metro), a metro line of the Moscow Metro, Moscow, Russia. Also known as "Kaluzhsko–Rizhskaya line".
Line 6 (Saint Petersburg Metro), a metro line of the Saint Petersburg Metro, Moscow, Russia. Also known as "Krasnoselsko–Kalininskaya line".
Line 6 (Naples Metro), a light metro line that forms part of the Naples Metro

North America

Canada
Line 6 (Montreal Metro), a proposed surface-running line of the Montreal Metro, Quebec, Canada
Line 6 Finch West, future light rail line in Toronto

Mexico
Mexico City Metro Line 6, connecting El Rosario and Martín Carrera in Mexico City

United States
6 (New York City Subway service), the 6 Lexington Avenue Local and 6 Pelham Bay Park Express, New York
6 (BMT rapid transit service), the designation for trains that used the BMT Fifth Avenue Line, New York City, New York
No. 6 Line (Baltimore streetcar), a bus route operated by the Maryland Transit Administration, Baltimore, Maryland
6 (Los Angeles Railway), former streetcar service

South America
Line 6 (São Paulo Metro), a planned extension of the São Paulo Metro, Brazil
Santiago Metro Line 6, connecting the communes of Cerrillos and Providencia in Santiago, Chile

Other uses
Line 6 (company), a manufacturer of digital modeling guitars, amplifiers and related electronic equipment

See also 
6 Train (disambiguation)
 List of public transport routes numbered 6